Kenneth Frank Charles Woolley, AM  B Arch, Hon DSc Arch Sydney LFRAIA, FTSE,  Architect, (29 May 1933 – 25 November 2015) was an Australian architect. In a career spanning 60 years, he is best known for his contributions to project housing with Pettit and Sevitt, the Wilkinson Award-winning Woolley House in Mosman, and his longstanding partnership with Sydney Ancher and Bryce Mortlock. He is regarded as being a prominent figure in the development of the Sydney School movement and Australian vernacular building.

Personal life 

Ken Woolley was born in Sydney on 29 May 1933. He attended Sydney Boys High School and studied architecture at the University of Sydney, graduating in 1955. On graduation, he worked in the Government Architects Branch of the New South Wales Public Works Department. During this time he was the design architect for the Fisher Library at the University of Sydney and the State Office Block (now demolished). He joined Ancher Mortlock Murray & Woolley in 1964, just prior to Ancher's retirement. This practice has received all the major architectural awards and created numerous outstanding buildings which include the Australian Embassy in Bangkok, Town Hall House Sydney, the Park Hyatt at Campbell's Cove, the ABC Radio and Orchestra Centre at Ultimo, the Victorian State Library, the Control Tower at Sydney Airport, the Olympics and RAS Dome Exhibition and Indoor Sports Halls, the Olympic Hockey Stadium, the Sydney Convention Centre, Darling Harbour and the refurbishment of the Queen Victoria Building. The most recent recognition was to the State Library of Victoria with the 2006 Lachlan Macquarie Award for Heritage Architecture.

Publications
Monograph: Australian Architects: Ken Woolley – RAIA 1985
A.S.Hook RAIA Gold Medal Address Sydney 1994 ‘State of the Art’
Walter Burley Griffin Memorial Lecture Canberra 1997 ‘Give Art a Chance’
Monograph: The Master Architect Series IV Ken Woolley and Ancher Mortlock & Woolley Selected and Current Works 1999
Address ‘A Pitch of Magnificence’ Academy of Technological Science & Engineering, 2001
Architect and Artist – Drawings by Ken Woolley – Published by Images, 2002
Author, ‘Reviewing the Performance, The Design of the Sydney Opera House,’ Watermark Press 2010
Author ‘Making Marks, Drawings by Ken Woolley,’ Watermark Press 2013

Notable projects 

Woolley took on a growing number of outside projects while still working with the Government Architect. He generated a reputation in the field of housing, winning a low cost competition for an exhibition house with Michael Dysart, in 1958. Consequently, both architects were invited to submit designs for a display village of model project houses in Carlingford, in 1961, proving to be a successful event that signalled the architect designed project house to be a welcome alternative to the individually designed and standard range houses of the time.

He began a working relationship with the project housing company, Pettit and Sevitt, the same year, creating house types of high quality design and construction. "Split Level", "Lowline" and other early forms incorporated design principles through simple lines, natural features and an emphasis on functionalism. They were widely affordable due to the standardised usage of materials: brick veneer construction, Gyprock plasterboard interior wall cladding, Monier concrete tiles and Stegbar aluminium windows. They often used basic grids, rectangular planes, and flat roofs, and were always firmly grounded with room to be easily adapted to various sites and terrains. These sophisticated types underwent various levels of modifications as they were marketed through display villages and later sold to individual buyers, who had a consultation with the architect to discuss the interior and exterior details, as a part of the service. Through these modifications based on the clients’ needs and clever marketing, these houses gained an unprecedented popularity with prominent architects worldwide.

At the completion of the Woolley House in Mosman in 1962, a work he would become most famous for, Ken Woolley emerged as a leading figure in a regional romantic movement often referred to as Sydney School. This new movement combined the influence of organic architecture, brutalism and the arts and crafts movement together with elements of the International Style, and came to embody the harmonious relationships between man and nature as intimate domestic spaces in the Australian bushland. The basis of the Woolley House design was derived from a series of garden terraces, most of which were covered by sections of timber roof sloping parallel to the land. A geometric order was applied to the plan as a series of 12-foot square units that combine to make up the main central space. Natural materials were exploited, with neutral colour schemes of dark tiles, western red cedar boarding and panelling, and painted bricks, creating a feeling of warmth in the house. The open plan living spaces were connected with volumes containing variations of ceiling height and changes in direction, enabling floor areas to be narrow but for the feeling of space to still be maximised. The house won RAIA’s Wilkinson Award the same year it was completed. The house was gifted to the University of NSW in 2016 by the Hesketh family.

Woolley joined the existing partnership of Sydney Ancher, Bryce Mortlock and Stuart Murray in 1964, and with Murray leaving the practice in 1975, as Ancher Mortlock & Woolley, the team went on to establish a reputation in the design of special purpose buildings. Notable examples are the Australian Broadcasting Corporation (ABC) Ultimo Centre, the RAS Dome and Exhibition Hall and the Olympic Hockey Stadium at Homebush.

In addition, Ken Woolley worked on notable concrete buildings (Newcastle University Union building and Macquarie University Union building), multi-housing projects (The Penthouses, Darling Point 1967) and buildings of structure and technology (Town Hall House and the Guided Missile Launching System Repair Facility), with many of them picking up various esteemed awards over the following two decades.
Among his many notable buildings in Sydney are the headquarters of the Australian Broadcasting Corporation in Ultimo, the Garvan Institute of Medical Research building in Darlinghurst (featuring an iconic DNA-inspired helical staircase), Sydney University's Fisher Library, the Park Hyatt Sydney, the former State Office Block and buildings on the Olympic site. There is also the Victorian State Library and the Australian Embassy in Bangkok.

Woolley was awarded the highest architectural honour in Australia when he received the RAIA Gold Medal in 1993.

Significant projects
(As Design Architect, Government Architect's Office):

1955            St. Margaret’s Hospital Chapel, Darlinghurst
1956            Chemistry School, Sydney University, with H Rembert & P Webber
1957–1962       Fisher Library, Sydney University
1960–1965       State Office Block. Completed 1967
1962            Lidcombe State Hospital Recreation Hall & Chapel

(In private practice, Ancher Mortlock and Woolley):

1962            Woolley House, Mosman
1962–1977       3500 Pettit & Sevitt houses
1965–1988  Student Unions at Macquarie, Newcastle and Sydney Universities
1971            Town Hall House, Sydney, and Sydney Square collaboration
1972            Government Housing, Canberra, 600 houses 1972–1982
1973            New Australian Embassy, Bangkok. Completed 1978	
1977            Port Vila, Vanuatu, & Honiara, Solomon Islands, Radio Broadcasting Stations
1979            Institute of Criminology Canberra, (competition winner). Unbuilt
1980            Woolley House, Cooper Street, Paddington
1980–1983       GMLS Assembly and Overhaul Building, Garden Island
1982            Australian Federal Police Headquarters, Canberra. Unbuilt
1983            National Archives Headquarters, Canberra. Unbuilt
1984            Commonwealth Law Courts, Parramatta
1984–1986        Woolley House, Palm Beach
1985            Exhibition Glass Houses, The Arc, Royal Botanic Gardens 
1985            Sydney Space Theatre, Power House Museum, Sydney. Unbuilt
1986            Hotel at the Opera House, Sydney. Unbuilt
1987            Australia Pavilion, Expo 88 Brisbane 
1987            Park Hyatt Hotel at Campbell’s Cove, Circular Quay, Sydney
1988            ABC Radio and Orchestra Centre, Sydney
1988            Walsh Bay Waterfront Redevelopment, Sydney. Unbuilt
1988            Australia Hellenic War Memorial, Canberra
1989            Parliamentary Triangle, Canberra, Urban Design elements
1989                    Urban Design Controls Civic, Central area, City Hill, Canberra
1990            Children's Medical Research Institute, Westmead
1991            Exhibition & Sports Halls for Olympics 2000 Bid, Homebush Bay
1992            Medium density tropical housing for South Pacific Forum, Nouméa
1992            Sand River Golf Club original design, Shenzhen, China
1993            Control Tower, Sydney Airport
1994            Garvan Institute of Medical Research, Darlinghurst
1994            Heritage refurbishment and courtyard infill, Education Department, Bridge Street, Sydney
1995            Bloodbank, Parramatta
1995            Woolley House, Stewart Street, Paddington. Alterations and additions
1996            Exhibition Hall Dome & Olympic 2000 Indoor Sports halls, Homebush Bay
1997            Sydney Convention & Exhibition Centre: Link Expansion, Darling Harbour
1998            Hockey Stadium, Olympics 2000, Homebush Bay
1999            Burswood International Resort Casino expansion, Perth, Western Australia 
2004            Queen Victoria Building, Sydney. Refurbishment
2004            Proposal for a Sydney Music Shell in the Domain
2005            Park Hyatt Hotel, Circular Quay. Rooftop suites extension
2005            Project Housing, model houses for Landcom, Hoxton Park, Sydney
2005            Completion of State Library of Victoria, from 1985 onwards
2007            Revival of Pettit & Sevitt project houses. 3 new designs
2008            Design for Hindley Street Hotel, Adelaide, with John Diekman
2008–2014          Proposal for Large New Opera Theatre at Sydney Opera House
2009            Completion of Queen Victoria. Refurbishment
2011            Northbourne Ave, Canberra, Sydney Ancher’s 1960  housing. 
2011	      Refurbishment and intensification
2012            Second Proposal for a Sydney Music Shell in the Domain

Monograph: Australian Architects: Ken Woolley – RAIA 1985

A.S.Hook RAIA Gold Medal Address Sydney 1994 ‘State of the Art’

Walter Burley Griffin Memorial Lecture Canberra 1997 ‘Give Art a Chance’

Address ‘A Pitch of Magnificence’ Academy of Technological Science & Engineering, 2001

Awards 

WILKINSON AWARD
1962         Woolley House, Mosman
1968         The Penthouses, Rushcutters Bay
1982         Woolley House, Paddington
1987         Woolley House, Palm Beach

NATIONAL ZELMAN COWAN AWARD
1986         Cadets Mess, ADFA, Canberra Medallion

NATIONAL ROBIN BOYD AWARD
1987         Woolley House, Palm Beach

LACHLAN MACQUARIE AWARD FOR HERITAGE ARCHITECTURE, RAIA
2005         The State Library of Victoria. Adaptive Reuse & Infill Buildings

VICTORIAN CHAPTER AWARD
2005         The Victorian Chapter RAIA Heritage Award

SULMAN AWARD
1963         Government Design Architect, Fisher Library, University of Sydney, Government Architect & T.O'Mahony Joint Architects

BLACKET AWARD FOR COUNTRY BUILDINGS
1967         University of Newcastle Union
1969         Staff House, University of Newcastle
1987        ‘The Anchorage’ Tweed Heads

CIVIC DESIGN AWARD
1978          Sydney Square

PROJECT HOUSE AWARD
1967–1977  Pettit & Sevitt. 14 awards

CANBERRA 25 YEAR AWARD
1997         Seventh Day Adventist Church
2002         RAIA Headquarters, Canberra 25 Year Award
2010         F.C Pye Field Environment Laboratory CSIRO, Canberra

MERIT AWARD FOR RESIDENTIAL, COMMERCIAL, PUBLIC, CIVIC or ADAPTIVE RE-USE 
1972         Wentworth Building, the University of Sydney
1976         Public Housing, Macquarie Fields
1979         Sydney Town Hall Complex
1980         Gardens Restaurant, Royal Botanic Gardens
1980–1983   GMLS Assembly and Overhaul Building, Garden Island
1981         Woolley House, Paddington
1982         Amenities Building, Garden Island
1982         Sydney Square (with Noel Bell-Ridley Smith)
1981         GMLS Workshop, Garden Island
1984         Mormon Church, Leura
1991         Park Hyatt Hotel, Campbell’s Cove
1992         ABC Radio and Orchestral Centre, Ultimo
1993         Children's Medical Research Institute, Westmead

PERSONAL
1988         Member of the Order of Australia (AM)
1993         The Gold Medal of the Royal Australian Institute of Architects]
2001         Fellow of the Academy of Technological Science and Engineering
2003         The Centenary of Federation Medal for services to structural engineering

Competition winners 

1958         Taubmans Australian ‘Low Cost’ House Competition, with Michael Dysart.
1966         Daily Telegraph House.
1976         Holsworthy Village Centre, Lend Lease.
1979         Institute of Criminology, Canberra, NCDC.
1980         Linley Cove Lend Lease Housing Development, Lane Cove.
1983         The Gateway, Circular Quay, Ideas Competition.
1983         The National Archives, Canberra, NCDC.
1986         The Victorian State Library and Museum, Melbourne.
1987         The Australian/Hellenic War Memorial Competition, Canberra, ACT.
1987         The Campbell’s Cove Hotel Competition, Circular Quay, Sydney.
1988         Walsh Bay Foreshore Development, jointly.
1991         Limited Competition, Royal Botanic Gardens Centre.
For more comprehensive project list, biography, bibliography, publications see ‘Ken Woolley & Ancher Mortlock & Woolley’  The Images Publishing Group.

Exhibitions 

1963         Sulman and Wilkinson Awards Exhibition Royal Australian Institute of Architects, Sydney.
1964         RAIA Members Exhibition, Sydney.
1967         Australian Exhibition, Expo Montreal and Expo Osaka, Japan, 1970.
1968–1982    RAIA Awards Exhibitions, Sydney and 1987–93.
1946–1976    Ancher Mortlock Murray and Woolley, Sydney Architects. 
1976         Art Gallery of New South Wales, Sydney and Australian Tour, 1977.
1980         Engehurst Exhibition RAIA, Pleasures of Architecture Conference.
1983         Competition for the Quay, Sydney, Exhibition at RAIA Sydney Convention.
1983–1985   'Old Continent New Building’ International Travelling Exhibition.
1985        ‘Australian Architects, Ken Woolley’, Art Gallery of New South Wales.
1985        ‘Australian Built, Responding to the Place’, Art Gallery of New South Wales.
1985         Triennale of World Architecture, Belgrade, Yugoslavia.
1986         Victorian State Library and Museum Competition Exhibition, Melbourne.
1987         Powerhouse Museum, ‘Australia by Design’ Exhibition.
1989         Sydney Harbour Foreshore Development Exhibition, RAIA.
1992         Exhibition of Australian Design Excellence, the Australian Academy of Design and Foreign Affairs Department, Manila and South East Asia.
1993         Powerhouse Museum, Design of the 50s.
2002         Drawings by Ken Woolley – New England Regional Art Museum.
2003         RAIA Gallery, Tusculum.
2009         Exhibition drawings, ‘Process’ University of Sydney Tinsheds Gallery.
2011         Peter Pinson Gallery. Drawings of Paris. 
2012         Peter Pinson Gallery, Etchings.
2013         Simon Chan Gallery – Architects collection of drawings.
2014         Simon Chan Gallery – Architects collection of drawings.

Writings

"Monograph: The Master Architect Series IV Ken Woolley and Ancher Mortlock & Woolley Selected and Current Works 1999". Limited numbers available on Amazon.com
"Art Works – Drawings by Ken Woolley". Published by Images, Exhibition 2002. Available through The Images Publishing Group. Also available second hand through Amazon.com 
"Reviewing the Performance, The Design of the Sydney Opera House" Ken Woolley. Watermark Press 2010. Available at art and architecture bookshops including the SOH Bookshop or from The Watermark Press.
"Making Marks, Drawings by Ken Woolley" Watermark Press 2013 Available through The Watermark Press.

Notes

External links

Ken Woolley at Ancher/Mortlock/Wooley website
Our house: histories of Australian homes, Australian Heritage Council website
Woolley House at Sydney Architecture website
Archive relating to Pettit & Sevitt project homes, 1962–1977 at Powerhouse Museum website
Baudish House

1933 births
2015 deaths
University of Sydney alumni
Members of the Order of Australia
Recipients of the Royal Australian Institute of Architects’ Gold Medal
Architects from Sydney